Helen D. Gillette (March 23, 1919 – November 25, 1991) is a former Democratic member of the Pennsylvania House of Representatives.

References

1991 deaths
Democratic Party members of the Pennsylvania House of Representatives
Women state legislators in Pennsylvania
1919 births
20th-century American politicians
20th-century American women politicians